The Matachewan hotspot was a volcanic hotspot responsible for the creation of the large 2,500 to 2,450 million year old Matachewan dike swarm, as well as continental rifting of the Superior and Hearne cratons during the Paleoproterozoic period.

See also
Volcanism of Canada
Volcanism of Eastern Canada
Mackenzie hotspot
Great Lakes Tectonic Zone

References
Short-lived mantle generated magmatic events and their dyke swarms: The key unlocking Earth's paleogeographic record back to 2.6 Ga

Volcanism of Ontario
Hotspots of North America
Paleoproterozoic volcanism